Guzeripl (Ġuzəryptl) is a rural locality (a settlement) in Dakhovskoye Rural Settlement of Maykopsky District, Russia. The population was 103 as of 2018. There are 5 streets.

Geography 
The settlement is located on the left bank of the Belaya River, 72 km south of Tulsky (the district's administrative centre) by road. Khamyshki is the nearest rural locality.

Ethnicity 
The settlement is inhabited by Russians.

References 

Rural localities in Maykopsky District